The 1931–32 Serie A season was won by Juventus.

Teams
Fiorentina and Bari had been promoted from Serie B.

Final classification

Relegation tie-breaker
Played in Bologna.

Brescia was relegated to Serie B.

Results

Top goalscorers

References and sources
Almanacco Illustrato del Calcio - La Storia 1898-2004, Panini Edizioni, Modena, September 2005

External links
 :it:Classifica calcio Serie A italiana 1932 - Italian version with pictures and info.
  - All results with goalscorers on RSSSF Website.

1931-32
1